The Association of International Olympic Winter Sports Federations (AIOWF) is an association of winter sports federations recognized by the International Olympic Committee that compete in the Olympic Winter Games.

Among other tasks, the AIOWF encourages cooperation among its members and is in charge of coordinating the competition calendar. The AIOWF is the qualified spokesperson dealing with specific issues related to winter sports in general and the Olympic Games in particular.

Its president is Ivo Ferriani of the International Bobsleigh and Skeleton Federation and it is headquartered in Zurich, Switzerland.

AIOWF Council
The Council is composed of a President and four Members, all from different Federations. One of the five Members is elected as secretary general. The President and all the Members are elected for 4-year mandates. The Treasurer is nominated by the Council on the proposal of the President as an executive position. The Treasurer is also on the Council, but without voting rights.

Member federations
There are 7 sport federations members of AIOWF.

See also
 International Olympic Committee (IOC)
 Association of Summer Olympic International Federations (ASOIF)
 Association of the IOC Recognised International Sports Federations (ARISF)
 SportAccord

Notes and references

External links
 IOC link

International Olympic Committee
 Association of International Olympic Winter Sports Federations
Skiing organizations
International sports bodies based in Switzerland
Organisations based in Zürich
Olympic organizations
Sports organizations established in 1976